Crimson Gold is a 2003 Iranian film directed by Jafar Panahi, and written by Abbas Kiarostami. The film was never distributed in Iranian theatres, because it was considered too "dark". Therefore, it was not possible that Crimson Gold be considered as the Iranian entry for Best Foreign Language Film for the 2003 Oscars as it was not released in Iran.

Plot 

The movie opens with a scene inside a jeweler's shop, which the main character, Hossein, appears to be attempting to rob.  Hossein tries to force The Jeweler, to give him the key to the safe at gunpoint.  The Jeweler refuses, and manages to trigger the alarm.  Hossein then shoots The Jeweler, and, after some deliberation, takes his own life as well.  The rest of the movie proceeds to tell Hossein's story.

The action flashes back to a scene two days before Hossein's attempted robbery. Hossein's friend, co-worker, and partner-in-crime Ali comes to tell Hossein that everything has been cleared for Hossein's marriage to Ali's sister (named "The Bride" in the credits).  He also empties a purse he has snatched, whose contents are meager save a slip of paper with the address of a jeweler's shop and a figure of 75 million tomans.  A con artist ("The Man in the Tea House"), overhears the conversation and joins them.  He expounds on the profession of pickpocketing.  Hossein, naturally sensitive to his social status, is somewhat offended by the con artist's automatic classification of him and Ali as mere pickpockets.  However, the con artist makes one point which can be taken as something of a universal truth: “If you want to arrest a thief, you’ll have to arrest the world.”  Later on, Hossein and Ali attempt to visit the jeweler's shop but are prevented from entering by "The Jeweler."

That night, Hossein reports for work as a pizza delivery man.  It appears that Hossein is also dealing with some mental stability issues relating to either his war experience, his medication, or both.  His first delivery is to a former war buddy, who gives him an oversize tip out of sympathy.  His next delivery is the to site of a raucous block party in one of the more wealthy districts of Tehran, which has been staked out by the police.  The police prevent Hossein from making the delivery, but also detain him--presumably until the party breaks up, expected to be around 4 AM. Since he will not be able to deliver the pizzas, Hossein offers slices to various police, soldiers and detainees at the scene.  None will accept a slice until after the police chief does.

The next morning, Hossein, Ali, and The Bride, dress nicely and gain admittance to the jeweler's shop.  They browse among jewelry much too expensive for their means, while Hossein primarily waits to see The Jeweler.  When The Jeweler actually shows up, he treats the three with the same condescension and contempt as before, suggesting that they go to a pawnshop to buy handcrafted gold that can be easily liquidated in an emergency, a not-so-subtle reminder of their social status.  Hossein, clearly disgusted, takes The Bride home and then goes home himself.

Upon arriving at his apartment, the difference between Hossein's accommodations and those of his clients is fairly obvious.  Hossein lays down on his bed and dozes for a while.  He is awakened by an arrest in a building close to his, and observes the police drag out a man who loudly and continuously protests his innocence.  The police pay no attention, and the class contrast is again seen, this time illustrated by the difference between the treatment of the wealthy and the poor by the police.

That night, Hossein again reports for pizza delivery duty.  On the way to his destination, Hossein encounters a fellow pizza courier who has been killed in an accident.  The destroyed motorbike and sprawled remains of the pizza warmer box are a grim reminder of the dangers of Tehran's freeways at night.

Hossein delivers the pizza to The Rich Man, who lives in an extremely wealthy district.  This is exemplified by the fact that as Hossein is on his way up, two young women come down, dressed in essentially Western clothing, something that would not be found in less affluent neighborhoods. He invites Hossein into his spacious apartment.  While The Rich Man is otherwise occupied with a phone call with one of the young women Hossein passed coming up, Hossein proceeds to make use of the apartment's many amenities, including a shave and a short swim.  Later, Hossein, obviously drunk, goes out onto The Rich Man's balcony and surveys the city-scape.

The next morning, the scene returns again to the jeweler's shop.  When The Jeweler comes and opens the shop, Hossein forces his way in with a gun and demands to see a specific piece of jewelry.  The Jeweler refuses to be pushed around, and Hossein then changes his demand to wanting the key to the safe.  The intent is to link this final scene back to the first scene, which culminates with Hossein taking his own life.

Filming 
Hossein Emadeddin, who plays the lead role, was not a professional actor but an actual pizza delivery man with paranoid schizophrenia, who made filming very difficult by destructiveness and noncooperation. After completion, the Iranian Ministry of Guidance insisted that cuts be made to the film, which Panahi refused, leading to the film being banned in Iran, even for private screenings.

Awards 
Cannes Film Festival, Un Certain Regard Jury Award.
Chicago International Film Festival, Gold Hugo.
Tbilisi International Film Festival, Golden Prometheus.
Valladolid International Film Festival, Golden Spike (Tied with Osama).

References

External links 

2003 films
2003 drama films
Iranian drama films
2000s Persian-language films
Films set in Iran
Films directed by Jafar Panahi
Abbas Kiarostami
Censored films
Film censorship in Iran